Ajit Kumar Doval  (born 20 January 1945) is the National Security Advisors (NSA) of India to the Prime minister Narendra Modi.  He was a RAW spy, Intelligence Bureau (IB) chief and Indian Police Service (IPS) officer. 

He previously served as the director of the IB in 2004–05, after working for a decade as the head of its operation wing. He worked as an undercover spy of RAW for one year in Pakistan, where he gathered information of various terrorist organisations and then 6 years as an officer in Indian high commission in Islambad.  

He is popularly called as "James Bond of India" due to his astonishing achivements as a RAW spy and service in IB. He spent most part of his career as a spy of IB. 

His successful operation as a spy and intelligence head includes Operation Black Thunder 1988, Rescue of 46 Indian national in Iraq, 2015's Operation versus Nagaland militants with India army, 2016 surgical strike on Pakistan, Operation to sabotage terror organisation PFI and many more.  

He was the founder director of right-wing think tank Vivekananda International Foundation (VIF), before appointment as NSA. It was founded in December 2009.

Early life and education
Doval was born in 1945 in Ghiri Banelsyun village in Pauri Garhwal in the erstwhile United Provinces, now in Uttarakhand. Doval's father, Major G. N. Doval, was an officer in the Indian Army.

He received his early education at the Ajmer Military School in Ajmer, Rajasthan. He graduated with a master's degree in economics from the Agra University in 1967. He has been awarded an honorary doctorate from Dr. Bhimrao Ambedkar University (formerly Agra University) in December 2017; Kumaun University in May 2018; and Amity University, in November 2018.

Police and intelligence career 
Doval joined the Indian Police Service (IPS) in 1968 in the Kerala cadre as the ASP of Kottayam district.  He was posted in north-east India. He was a spy of Research and Analysis Wing (RAW), lived in Pakistan for seven years and did espionage.  

He was actively involved in anti-insurgency operations in Punjab.

Doval worked in Thalassery, Kerala, for a few months in 1972, before joining the central service.  He has the experience of being involved in the termination of all 15 hijackings of Indian Airlines aircraft from 1971 to 1999. In the headquarters, he headed IB's operations wing for over a decade and was founder Chairman of the Multi Agency Centre (MAC), as well as of the Joint Task Force on Intelligence (JTFI). 

In 1988 during Operation Black Thunder, he infiltrated in Golden temple posing as an ISI agent, did espionage on Khalistani terrorists, Doval gathered information about their weapons and made maps of their positions, he became an important member in their group gave wrong advices to them to sabotaged, it helped National Security Guards (NSG) to win Golden Temple.

He played a role in intelligence for Sikkim's merger with India. He was trained under M. K. Narayanan, the third National Security Advisor of India for a brief period in counterterrorism operations. He was part of the team which sent to Kandahar, Afganistan for negotiations to release passengers of hijacked  aeroplane IC-814. 

He was later appointed on the post of, director of the Intelligence Bureau. 

2016 Surgical strike on Pakistan was part of Ajit Doval's 'offensive defence stretegy'.

Doval was one of the seven person who knew about India's highly classified 2019 Balakot airstrike, including Indian Navy, army, airforce chiefs and prime minister Narendra Modi. After Pakistan based terrorist attacked convoy of CRPF by car bomb in Pulwama and martyred 40, India airforce did unprecedented airstrike on terrorist bases in Pakistan. Doval was awake that whole night with dignitaries in the war room.

Post-retirement (2005–2014)
Doval retired in January 2005 as Director, Intelligence Bureau. In December 2009, he became the founding Director of the Vivekananda International Foundation (VIF), a public policy think tank set up by the Vivekananda Kendra. Doval has remained actively involved in the discourse on national security in India. Besides writing editorial pieces for several leading newspapers and journals, he has delivered lectures on India's security challenges and foreign policy objectives at several renowned government and non-governmental institutions, security think-tanks in India and abroad.

In 2009 and 2011 he co-wrote two reports on "Indian Black Money Abroad in Secret Banks and Tax Havens", with others, leading in the field as a part of the task force constituted by Bharatiya Janata Part (BJP). 

In 2012, IB eyed on him due to then ruling party Congress's suspicions on Doval and his think tank VIF with the doubts that he and VIF were the brains behind Ramdev and Anna Hazare led anti-corruption movement, which generated anger against government. Many members of VIF got appointed to top government positions after BJP came into power.

In recent years, he has delivered guest lectures on strategic issues at IISS, London, Capitol Hill, Washington DC, Australia-India Institute, University of Melbourne, National Defence College, New Delhi and the Lal Bahadur Shastri National Academy of Administration, Mussoorie. Doval has also spoken internationally at global events, citing the ever-increasing need of co-operation between the major established and emerging powers of the world.

National Security Advisor (2014–present)

On 30 May 2014, Doval was appointed as India's fifth National Security Advisor. In June 2014, Doval facilitated the return of 46 Indian nurses who were trapped in a hospital in Tikrit, Iraq, following the capture of Mosul by ISIL. Doval, flew to Iraq on 25 June 2014 to understand the position on the ground and make high-level contacts in the Iraqi government. Although the exact circumstances of their release are unclear, on 5 July 2014, ISIL militants handed the nurses to Kurdish authorities at Erbil city and an Air India plane specially-arranged by the Indian government brought them back home to Kochi.

Along with Army Chief General Dalbir Singh Suhag, Doval planned a cross-border military operation against National Socialist Council of Nagaland (NSCN-K) separatists operating out of Myanmar. Indian officials claimed that the mission was a success and 20-38 separatist belonging to Nationalist Socialist Council of Nagaland (NSCN-K) were killed in the operation. However, the Myanmar government denied the strikes. According to Myanmar officials, the Indian operation against NSCN-K took place entirely on the Indian side of the border.

He is widely credited for the doctrinal shift in Indian national security policy in relation to Pakistan. It was speculated that the September 2016 Indian strikes in Pakistan-controlled Kashmir were his brainchild. Doval is widely credited along with then Foreign Secretary S. Jaishankar and Indian Ambassador to China Vijay Keshav Gokhale, for resolving Doklam Standoff through diplomatic channels and negotiations.

In October 2018, he was appointed as the Chairman of the Strategic Policy Group (SPG), which is the first tier of a three tier structure at the National Security Council and forms the nucleus of its decision-making apparatus.

Following the 2019 Balakot airstrike and retaliatory 2019 Jammu and Kashmir airstrikes and subsequent capture of Indian pilot Abhinandan Varthaman by Pakistani military, Ajit Doval had held talks with US Secretary of State and National Security Advisor to secure the release of the Indian pilot.

On 3 June 2019, he was reappointed as NSA for 5 years and granted the personal rank of a Cabinet Minister. Doval is the first NSA to hold such a rank. He is widely considered to be one of Modi’s most powerful and trusted advisors, with major influence over India’s national security and foreign affairs.

He was also an instrumental figure in revocation of the special status of Jammu and Kashmir.

On 26, Feb 2020, Ajit Doval walked the streets of riot-hit northeast Delhi to assess the situation and reassure the local residents.

On 15 May 2020, the military forces of Myanmar handed over a group of 22 militant leaders, active in Assam and other northeast states, to the Indian government. This was made possible through negotiations headed by Doval. 

On 15 September 2020, Doval walked out of a virtual SCO meeting after Pakistan projected a fictitious map omitting parts of India.

Awards and recognitions
 Doval was the youngest police officer to receive the Police Medal for meritorious service. He was given the award after six years in the police force.
 Doval was later awarded the President's Police Medal.
 In 1988, Doval was granted one of the highest gallantry awards, the Kirti Chakra, becoming the first police officer to receive a medal previously given only as a military honour.

In media 

 Doval  appeared on Epic TV's show Adrishya, in which his success against Khalistani terrorists during Operation Black Thunder was featured.
 In film Uri: The Surgical Strike (2019) his cinematic character was played by Paresh Rawal.

See also 

 Ravindra Kaushik - spy of India.
 Bahirji Naik - spy of Chatrapati Shivaji Maharaj
 Operation Wrath of God - covert operation of Israel's spy agency Mossad to revange Munich massacre against Palestine terrorists.

References

Further reading 

|-

Indian Police Service officers
Living people
1945 births
People from Pauri Garhwal district
Garhwali people
Directors of Intelligence Bureau (India)
Indian spies
Spymasters
People from Uttarakhand
Recipients of the Kirti Chakra
University of Madras alumni
National Defence College, India alumni
Kirti Chakra